The 2012–13 Lega Basket Serie A was the 91st season of the Lega Basket Serie A, the top level basketball league in Italy. The season started 26 September 2012 and ended on 19 June 2013. Montepaschi Siena initially won the championship. However, their championship was revoked in 2016 after investigations exposed financial and fiscal fraud.

Teams

Acea Roma
Angelico Biella
Banco di Sardegna Sassari
chebolletta Cantù
Cimberio Varese
EA7 Emporio Armani Milano
Montepaschi Siena
Enel Brindisi
Juve Caserta
SAIE3 Bologna
Scavolini Banca Marche Pesaro
Sidigas Avellino
Sutor Montegranaro
Trenkwalder Reggio Emilia
Umana Venezia
Vanoli Cremona

Regular season

Playoffs

References

External links
Lega Basket website 

Lega Basket Serie A seasons
1
Italy